John T. Broderick Jr. (born 1947) is a former Chief Justice of the New Hampshire Supreme Court. He served as Associate Justice of the court from 1995 to 2004 and as its Chief Justice from 2004 to 2010. Broderick holds a J.D. from the University of Virginia School of Law and a B.A. from the College of the Holy Cross. Broderick also served as Dean and President of the University of New Hampshire School of Law until May 2015. Since 2015, Broderick has been on a journey to end the stigma surrounding mental health in New Hampshire.

Organizations
Board of Directors, National Legal Services Corporation, 1993–present
President, New Hampshire Bar Association, 1990–1991
American College of Trial Lawyers Association

Professional History
Dean, University of New Hampshire School of Law, 2011 – 2014
Chief Justice, New Hampshire Supreme Court, 2004 – 2010
Associate Justice, New Hampshire Supreme Court, 1995 – 2004
Adjunct Professor, Tuck School of Business, Dartmouth College, 2000 - 2010 
Broderick & Dean, Professional Association, 1989 – 1995 (Formerly Merrill & Broderick, Professional Association) 
Devine, Millimet, Stahl & Branch, 1972 – 1989 (Chair Litigation Department)

Honors and Professional Recognition
Fellow, American College of Trial Lawyers, 1989 – present
Best Lawyers in America, 1987 – 1995
2014 Perkins Bass Fellow, Rockefeller Center, Dartmouth College
Fellow, American Bar Foundation
Lifetime Achievement Award, NH Business & Industry Association, 2010
Fellow, New Hampshire Bar Foundation (Board of Directors, 1985 – 1991)
Honorary Fellow, New Hampshire Bar Foundation, 2003
Recipient, 2002 Justice William A. Grimes Award for Judicial Professionalism, NH Bar Association, (June 2002 and 2010)
Recipient, L. Jonathan Ross Award for Outstanding Commitment to Legal Services for the Poor, NH Bar Association, February 2007
Member, American Law Institute, 2007 – present
Recipient, Institute for the Advancement of the American Legal System's Third Annual Transparent
Courthouse® Award (prior recipients were Justice Sandra Day O’Connor and Chief Justice Christine Durham, Supreme Court of Utah)
Distinguished Citizen of the Year, Daniel Webster Council, Boy Scouts of New Hampshire 
2011 President's Award for Distinguished Public Service, presented by the N.H. Bar Association 
2015 The Inaugural John Tobin Access to Justice Award, 2016
Governor's Commission on Disability Lifetime Achievement Award, 2016

References

External links
State of Judiciary Speech, March 25, 2009

1947 births
Chief Justices of the New Hampshire Supreme Court
College of the Holy Cross alumni
Living people
University of Virginia School of Law alumni